Detlef Kübeck (born 22 February 1956 in Schwerin, Bezirk Schwerin) is a retired East German sprinter who specialized in the 200 metres.

At the 1982 European Championships he won a silver medal in the 4 x 100 metres relay with teammates Thomas Munkelt, Olaf Prenzler and Frank Emmelmann. He also competed in the 200 metres, but did not reach the final. He became East German champion in 1982.

Achievements

References

1956 births
Living people
Sportspeople from Schwerin
People from Bezirk Schwerin
East German male sprinters
Sportspeople from Mecklenburg-Western Pomerania
European Athletics Championships medalists